Juan Gabriel Valverde Ribera (born June 24, 1990 in Santa Cruz de la Sierra), known as Gabriel Valverde or simply Valverde, is a Bolivian footballer who plays for The Strongest as defender in the Bolivian Primera División.

Career statistics

References

External links

 at BDFA.com.ar

1990 births
Living people
Bolivian footballers
Association football defenders
Bolivian Primera División players
The Strongest players
Club Bolívar players
Club Blooming players
Club San José players
Sportspeople from Santa Cruz de la Sierra